RAN is an Indonesian pop rock band formed in Jakarta, Indonesia in November 2006. The group comprises Rayi Putra Rahardjo (vocals/rap), Astono "Asta" Andoko (guitars), and Anindyo "Nino" Baskoro (vocals), the group name taken from the members' initials. Their music combines elements of jazz, R&B, rock, hip hop, and funk.

They released their debut album, RAN for Your Life in 2007, from which the successful single "Pandangan Pertama" was taken. They also had a hit with "Dekat di Hati". They have gone on to release four more albums.

In November 2015 they collaborated with Kahitna on the single "Salamku Untuk Kekasihmu Yang Baru".

Putra has also recorded as a solo artist.

Members
 Rayi Putra Rahardjo — vocals, rap vocals 
 Astono "Asta" Andoko — guitars 
 Anindyo "Nino" Baskoro — vocals

Discography

Studio albums

Singles

Awards and nominations 

|-
| rowspan="2"| 2008
| rowspan="2"| RAN
| MTV Indonesia Awards — Most Favourite Band/Group/Duo
| 
|-
| MTV Indonesia Awards — Most Favourite Breakthrough Artist
| 
|-
| rowspan="5"| 2009
| rowspan="4"| RAN
| Rolling Stone Indonesia Editors' Choice Awards — Rookie of the Year
| 
|-
| Indonesia Kids' Choice Awards —  Favorite Duo/Group
| 
|-
| MTV Indonesia Awards — Best Artist of the Year
| 
|-
| Dahsyatnya Awards —  Outstanding Duo/Group Singer
| 
|-
| "Ratu Lebah"
| MTV Indonesia Awards — Best Original Soundtrack
| 
|-
| rowspan="4"| 2010
| "T.G.I. Friday"
| Indonesian Music Awards — Best R&B Production Work
| 
|-
| rowspan="2"| RAN
| Indonesia Kids' Choice Awards —  Favorite Duo/Group
| 
|-
| Dahsyatnya Awards —  Outstanding Duo/Group Singer
| 
|-
| "Jadi Gila"
| Dahsyatnya Awards —  Outstanding Video Clip
| 
|-
| rowspan="2"| 2011
| "Karena Kusuka Dirimu"
| Dahsyatnya Awards —  Outstanding Video Clip
| 
|-
| RAN – "Karena Kusuka Dirimu"
| Dahsyatnya Awards —  Outstanding Role in Video Clip
| 
|-
| rowspan="3"| 2012
| rowspan="2"| RAN
| Planet Muzik Awards — Best Duo/Group & Band
| 
|-
| Dahsyatnya Awards —  Outstanding Duo/Group Singer
| 
|-
| "Sepeda"
| Dahsyatnya Awards —  Outstanding Video Clip
| 
|-
| 2013
| "Kulakukan Semua Untukmu"
| Dahsyatnya Awards —  Outstanding Video Clip
| 
|-
| 2014
| "Kita Bisa" (featuring Tulus)
| Indonesian Music Awards — Best R&B/Soul Production Work
| 
|-
| rowspan="5"| 2015
| rowspan="2"| "Dekat di Hati"
| Rolling Stone Indonesia Editors' Choice Awards — Hits of the Year
| 
|-
| Dahsyatnya Awards —  Outstanding Song
| 
|-
| rowspan="3"| RAN
| Mnet Asian Music Awards —  Best Asian Artist Indonesia
| 
|-
| Indonesia Kids' Choice Awards —  Favorite Group/Band/Duo
| 
|-
| Dahsyatnya Awards —  Outstanding Duo/Group
| 
|-
| 2017
| RAN
| Indonesian Music Awards — Best Pop Album
| 
|}

References

External links 
  
 
 RAN discography on Discogs
 RAN discography on iTunes

Musical groups established in 2006
Indonesian pop music groups
2006 establishments in Indonesia
Anugerah Musik Indonesia winners
MAMA Award winners